This is a list of rugby league footballers who have played professionally for the Toronto Wolfpack. Players are listed according to the date of their first professional match in which they played for the club. Appearances and points are for first-team competitive matches only.

These lists encompass player records from the:
 Super League competition, 2020–present.
 Challenge Cup competition, 2017–present.
 Championship competition, 2018–2019.
 League 1 competition, 2017.

Key:
 No. — Order of debut. Craig Hall, as the foundation captain, is given No 1.
 App — Total number of games played, both as a starter, and as a substitute
 T — Total number of tries scored
 G — Total number of goals kicked
 FG — Total number of field goals kicked
 Pts — Total number of points scored

List of players
Bold - Denotes current players.

Statistics correct as of 2020 Challenge Cup Round 5.

References

External links
 Official Website

 
Toronto Wolfpack players